Sam Myers (born 25 May 1990) is a professional Rugby Union player. He represents Australia in Sevens Rugby. Born in Forbes, New South Wales and playing for Northern Suburbs at a club level, he debuted for Australia in December 2013. As of December 2015, he currently has 17 caps.

A member of Sydney Northern Suburbs 7s side and first and second grade 15s side, Sam Myers was called up to make his debut for Australia to replace the injured Lewis Holland in the third round of the Qantas Men’s Sevens 2013/2014 HSBC Sevens World Series campaign in South Africa. His combination of power and pace and ability to make numerous line breaks adds an extra dimension to the team. Sam was named in the London Sevens tournament Dream Team in May 2014 after running in seven tries during the course of the weekend, and played in every round of the 2013-14 HSBC Sevens World Series. Sam played in all but one of the legs during the 2014-15 season. Head Coach Geraint John handed Myers a full-time contract with the Men's Rugby Sevens program in September 2014. Representative Honours include Northern Suburbs Sevens - 1st and 2nd Grade and the 2014 Commonwealth Games held in Scotland.

References

1990 births
Australian rugby union players
Commonwealth Games rugby sevens players of Australia
Male rugby sevens players
Australia international rugby sevens players
Living people
Commonwealth Games medallists in rugby sevens
Commonwealth Games bronze medallists for Australia
Rugby sevens players at the 2014 Commonwealth Games
Rugby union players from New South Wales
Medallists at the 2014 Commonwealth Games